Masajiro Hayashi was an officer in the Imperial Japanese Navy during World War II. He was a member of the 51st Class of the Imperial Japanese Naval Academy, ranking 182 out of 255 Cadets. He was in command of forces during the Battle of Milne Bay (specifically, the 5th Kure Naval District Special Naval Landing Force (SNLF)) until he was apparently killed during the battle. Other sources state that he was relieved of command by Minoru Yano.

Known Assignments 
Division Officer Kinu - 1 December 1930 - ???
Division Officer Ise - 1 November 1934 - ???
Commanding Officer, 6th Sasebo Naval District Special Naval Landing Force (SNLF) - 20 December 1937 - 27 January 1938
Staff Officer, Kure Guard Force - 20 November 1941 - 15 January 1942
Commanding Officer, 1st Kure Naval District Special Naval Landing Force (SNLF) - 21 January 1942 - 10 March 1942
Commanding Officer, 5th Kure Naval District Special Naval Landing Force (SNLF) - 1 May 1942 - 1 September 1942

Promotions 
Midshipman - 14 July 1923
Ensign - 1 December 1924
Sub-Lieutenant - 1 December 1926
Lieutenant - 30 November 1929
Lieutenant Commander - 15 November 1935
Commander - 15 November 1940
Captain - 1 September 1942 (posthumous)

References 

Japanese military personnel of World War II